Mittermeier is a German surname. Notable people with the surname include:

 Michael Mittermeier (born 1966), German comedian
 Russell A. Mittermeier (born 1949), primatologist, herpetologist and biological anthropologist
 Cristina Mittermeier (born 1966), Mexican photographer

See also
Mittermaier

German-language surnames